Season 5 of Dance Plus started 9 November 2019 on Star Plus and is produced by Urban Brew Studios in association with Frames Productions. The season is hosted by Raghav Juyal.

Super judge
Remo D'Souza, the super judge, is an Indian dancer, choreographer, actor and film director.

Captains
The following are the four captains of the season.
 Dharmesh Yelande
 Punit Pathak
 Karishma chavan 
 Suresh Mukund

Teams
Contestant info

Dance styles of team

International squad challenge
From Dance plus season 3, D'Souza added a new challenge for dancers. Here he will invite an international dance artist every week.

Top 10

Finalist

Special guests

Score chart
Captain's info

Contestant Info 

	

The scores were given in the following manner: 
1. Each captain gave a challenge to two teams. One performer from each of the two challenged teams performed. A captain can score out of 10. The performer belonging to that captain cannot give the score. The score were given by the challenger and the non challenged team captain. 
2. Remo had a power of giving the score out of 20. Remo also had the power to give double plus to the team and the team got additional 10 points. 
3. Second round is the International Squad round. Remo gave the score out of 20. Artists from each team performed. The team whose score is equal to that of the International Squad, got their score doubled for that round. 
4. Top two teams with Highest Scores (sum of scores from previous rounds) proceed for the final showdown and the winner is decided by Remo. The team whose artist won the final showdown is the winner of that week. 
5. Winning captain chose two performers from their team to advance to Top 10 and Remo chose amongst them. 
6. After Top 10 is chosen (8th week onwards), Remo scored out of 20 but he also gave an additional 10 points (double plus). Also, teams can score an additional 10 points after winning bonus battle.

References

External links 
 Dance Plus (season 5)  Trailer on YouTube

2019 Indian television seasons